Barend Cornelis Koekkoek (October 11, 1803 – April 5, 1862) was a Dutch landscape artist and lithographer.

Biography

Early life: 1803–1824

Barend Cornelis Koekkoek was born on 11 October 1803, in Middelburg, Zeeland. He was the first and eldest son of Johannes Hermanus Koekkoekborn in the province of Zeeland, to Dutch parentsand Anna van Koolwijk. Aside from Koekkoek, whose father was a Dutch renowned marine painter, from whom he received his earliest tuition, Johannes and Anna's other sons were Hermanus (the elder),  (the Younger) and Marinus.

Barend grew up in an artistic environment and came to be known during his lifetime as the “Prince of Landscape Painting” and was an applauded landscapist of his time and regarded as the founding father of Dutch romantic landscape painting. The recipient of endless awards and decorations, he counted among his clients King Friedrich-Wilhelm IV of Prussia, Tsar Alexander II, and King Willem II of the Netherlands.

His brothers were both successful artists, the first as a painter of marine subjects and river scenes, the second as a landscapist. In 1817 he enrolled at the Drawing Academy of Middelburg, where he studied under Abraham Krayestein. On moving to Amsterdam in 1822, he studied for four years at the Koninklijke Academie van Beeldende Kunsten, and by 1824, at 19 years of age, he voiced his ambition to become a painter of landscapes. 

He concentrated on extensive wooded landscapes in summer and winter, a theme deducted from the four season series. Like other Romantic painters such as Caspar David Friedrich, Koekkoek painted the motif of tiny figures within imposing, majestic natural environments to contrast humble humanity with the greatness of creation.

This was a popular subject matter in the Golden Age, the main source of inspiration for nineteenth-century artists. A two years stay in the rural setting of Hilversum (1826–1827), housing a colony of landscape and cattle painters, strengthened his decision. The landscapes he painted in the rural surroundings of Hilversum were received favourably. In 1829, the Amsterdam society Felix Meritis awarded one of Koekkoek's summer landscapes a gold medal. In 1833 he married Elise Thérèse Daiwaille (1814–81), the daughter of his longtime teacher and friend, Master Jean Augustin Daiwaille, with whom he had five daughters. One of them, also became a painter.

Career

The flat Dutch countryside could not satisfy Koekkoek's romantic soul for very long. ‘Surely’, Koekkoek wrote in 1841 ‘Our fatherland boasts no rocks, waterfalls, high mountains or romantic valleys. Proud, sublime nature is not to be found in our land’. With that in mind, in the summer of 1834 he moved to the old Ducal capital of Cleves, Germany, where he found his ideal subject matter in the region of the Ahr, Ruhr and Rhine. Soon large oak trees, winding paths and panoramic views filled his paintings with an artful blend of minute detail and atmospheric mood. In Cleves, where he would spend the rest of his life, Koekkoek painted his most important landscapes, ranging from extensive river valleys to idyllic forest views dominated by one or more oaks. He often dramatized his trees as a means to emphasize man's paltriness in comparison to nature.

By 1841, Koekkoek had earned such regard from his fellow artists that he decided to publish a book of lessons for students, Herinneringen en Mededeelingen van eenen Landschapsschilder ("Recollections and Communications of a Landscape Painter"), in which he aired the view that an artist must, above all, stay true to nature through meticulous observation and rigorous draughtsmanship. This seminal work took the form of a leisurely journey along the Rhine, pointing out to the reader various qualities of nature and landscape. The same year, by popular demand from young artists eager to receive his tuition, Koekkoek founded his own drawing academy (Zeichen Collegium), and in his footsteps, many artists travelled to the former ducal residence seeking instruction from the great master at the academy, among them Frederik Marinus Kruseman, Lodewijk Johannes Kleijn, and Johann Bernard Klombeck. Closely adhering to their master's principles expressed in his writings and in his paintings, these artists collectively gave rise to the school of landscape painting referred to as 'Cleves Romanticism', blending realism with a pervading idealized atmosphere. He advised his students to study nature closely, to observe the qualities of light at dawn and at sunset and the development of storms. He also guided his students in the examination of Dutch seventeenth century masters. The 1840s-50s saw Koekkoek at the very height of his genius. In November 1859 Koekkoek suffered from a major stroke which effectively ended his career as a painter. He died April 5, 1862, in his beloved town of Cleves.

Work

Koekkoek's own paintings reveal a careful study and synthesis of Dutch seventeenth-century painters. His art is firmly rooted in the great Dutch romantic tradition established by the seventeenth-century masters: Hobbema, Cuyp, Ruisdael and Wynants. The golden light and the inclusion of travellers in his work suggests Koekkoek also admired the Dutch Italianate painters of the seventeenth century, collectively known as the Bamboccianti, especially Pieter van Laer and Jan Both.

Koekkoek imagined his pictures as the result of an ideal combination of observation and artifice. He studied art and nature with equal acuity, creating beautiful landscape paintings that celebrated the greatness of Creation. ‘Koekkoek's work impresses the spectator by its power, by the firm and correct construction of the trees, by the broad, natural growth of the leaves and boughs, [and] by the careful and elaborate reproduction of the wooded landscape’ (G. H. Marius, Dutch Painters of the Nineteenth Century, Woodbridge, 1973, p. 89). Up to this day, Koekkoek's work is very much favoured for the lively composition and the mood of nostalgia, in which the Dutch Golden Age seems to linger on. Just as he was during his own lifetime, Koekkoek is widely regarded as the most accomplished landscape painter of Dutch romanticism, against whose scrupulously refined paintings the work his contemporaries is measured.

Haus Koekkoek, Cleves

Koekkoek's financial success allowed him to purchase a plot of land in downtown Cleves in 1842 and build a grand villa in italianate style over the next seven years. After his death in 1862, the house was sold and the majority of its furnishings were auctioned off in Amsterdam. In 1902 the German doctor Hans van Ackeren purchased and expanded the property, added an extension to the house and remodeled its interior in Art Nouveau style. Fortunately the house remained essentially undamaged in WW II; it was subsequently used as city-hall for several years during which time it hosted art annual exhibits by the Kleve Artist's Association. From 1960 it became the municipal museum and in 1997 it was returned to its state as an artist's residence.

Works

Notes

References

External links

 official website of the Museum B.C. Koekkoek-Haus, Kleve, in English language.
 short film with many images of Koekkoek's landscape-paintings
 artworks in the Boijmans van Beuningen
 Works by Koekkoek in the Dordrechts Museum
 biography notes and dates of B.C. Koekkoek, in the Dutch R.K.D. Archive, The Hague

1803 births
1862 deaths
People from Middelburg, Zeeland
19th-century Dutch painters
Dutch male painters
19th-century Dutch male artists